Salsa verde is a type of spicy, green sauce in Mexican cuisine based on tomatillo and green chili peppers.

The tomatillo-based Mexican salsa verde dates to the Aztec Empire, as documented by the Spanish physician Francisco Hernández, and is distinct from the various medieval European parsley-based green sauces.

In the cuisines of Mexico and the Southwestern United States, it is often served with Mexican or Tex-Mex style dishes like enchiladas and chicharrón (pork rinds). The version typical of New Mexico consists mostly of green chile rather than tomatillos.

Types
A  or a blender can be used for the grinding process. Cooking or roasting the tomatillo will enhance the flavor, providing a sweeter salsa. After the sauce is prepared, it can be cooked again in a pan with a little oil.

See also

 Green sauce
 Salsa roja
 Pipián (sauce), another Mexican green sauce

References

Bayless, Rick; Mexico One Plate at a Time (2000); 
Muñoz Zurita, Ricardo; Pequeño Larousee de la Gastronomía Mexicana (2013); 

Chili pepper dishes
Sauces
Mexican cuisine